There were no defending champions as the last edition of the tournament was canceled due to the COVID-19 pandemic.

Denys Molchanov and Aleksandr Nedovyesov won the title after defeating Nathan Pasha and Max Schnur 6–4, 6–4 in the final.

Seeds

Draw

References

External links
 Main draw

Nur-Sultan Challenger - Doubles